A tower is a tall structure, taller than it is wide, often by a significant factor. Towers are distinguished from masts by their lack of guy-wires and are therefore, along with tall buildings, self-supporting structures.

Towers are specifically distinguished from buildings in that they are built not to be habitable but to serve other functions using the height of the tower. For example, the height of a clock tower improves the visibility of the clock, and the height of a tower in a fortified building such as a castle increases the visibility of the surroundings for defensive purposes. Towers may also be built for observation, leisure, or telecommunication purposes. A tower can stand alone or be supported by adjacent buildings, or it may be a feature on top of a larger structure or building.

Etymology
Old English torr is from Latin turris via Old French tor. The Latin term together with Greek τύρσις was loaned from a pre-Indo-European Mediterranean language, connected with the Illyrian toponym
Βου-δοργίς. With the Lydian toponyms Τύρρα, Τύρσα, it has been connected with the ethnonym Τυρρήνιοι as well as with Tusci (from *Turs-ci), the Greek and Latin names for the Etruscans (Kretschmer Glotta 22, 110ff.)

History
Towers have been used by mankind since prehistoric times. The oldest known may be the circular stone tower in walls of Neolithic Jericho (8000 BC). Some of the earliest towers were ziggurats, which existed in Sumerian architecture since the 4th millennium BC. The most famous ziggurats include the Sumerian Ziggurat of Ur, built in the 3rd millennium BC, and the Etemenanki, one of the most famous examples of Babylonian architecture. 

Some of the earliest surviving examples are the broch structures in northern Scotland, which are conical tower houses. These and other examples from Phoenician and Roman cultures emphasised the use of a tower in fortification and sentinel roles. For example, the name of the Moroccan city of Mogador, founded in the first millennium BC, is derived from the Phoenician word for watchtower ('migdol'). The Romans utilised octagonal towers as elements of Diocletian's Palace in Croatia, which monument dates to approximately 300 AD, while the Servian Walls (4th century BC) and the Aurelian Walls (3rd century AD) featured square ones. The Chinese used towers as integrated elements of the Great Wall of China in 210 BC during the Qin Dynasty. Towers were also an important element of castles.

Other well known towers include the Leaning Tower of Pisa in Pisa, Italy built from 1173 until 1372, the Two Towers in Bologna, Italy built from 1109 until 1119 and the Towers of Pavia (25 survive), built between 11th and 13th century. The Himalayan Towers are stone towers located chiefly in Tibet built approximately 14th to 15th century.

Mechanics
Up to a certain height, a tower can be made with the supporting structure with parallel sides. However, above a certain height, the compressive load of the material is exceeded, and the tower will fail. This can be avoided if the tower's support structure tapers up the building.

A second limit is that of buckling—the structure requires sufficient stiffness to avoid breaking under the loads it faces, especially those due to winds. Many very tall towers have their support structures at the periphery of the building, which greatly increases the overall stiffness.

A third limit is dynamic; a tower is subject to varying winds, vortex shedding, seismic disturbances etc. These are often dealt with through a combination of simple strength and stiffness, as well as in some cases tuned mass dampers to damp out movements. Varying or tapering the outer aspect of the tower with height avoids vibrations due to vortex shedding occurring along the entire building simultaneously.

Functions
Although not correctly defined as towers, many modern high-rise buildings (in particular skyscraper) have 'tower' in their name or are colloquially called 'towers'. Skyscrapers are more properly classified as 'buildings'. In the United Kingdom, tall domestic buildings are referred to as tower blocks. In the United States, the original World Trade Center had the nickname the Twin Towers, a name shared with the Petronas Twin Towers in Kuala Lumpur. In addition some of the structures listed below do not follow the strict criteria used at List of tallest towers.

Strategic advantages
The tower throughout history has provided its users with an advantage in surveying defensive positions and obtaining a better view of the surrounding areas, including battlefields. They were constructed on defensive walls, or rolled near a target (see siege tower). Today, strategic-use towers are still used at prisons, military camps, and defensive perimeters.

Potential energy
By using gravity to move objects or substances downward, a tower can be used to store items or liquids like a storage silo or a water tower, or aim an object into the earth such as a drilling tower. Ski-jump ramps use the same idea, and in the absence of a natural mountain slope or hill, can be human-made.

Communication enhancement
In history, simple towers like lighthouses, bell towers, clock towers, signal towers and minarets were used to communicate information over greater distances. In more recent years, radio masts and cell phone towers facilitate communication by expanding the range of the transmitter. The CN Tower in Toronto, Ontario, Canada was built as a communications tower, with the capability to act as both a transmitter and repeater.

Transportation support
Towers can also be used to support bridges, and can reach heights that rival some of the tallest buildings above-water. Their use is most prevalent in suspension bridges and cable-stayed bridges. The use of the pylon, a simple tower structure, has also helped to build railroad bridges, mass-transit systems, and harbors.

Control towers are used to give visibility to help direct aviation traffic.

Other
 To access tall or high objects: launch tower, service tower, service structure, scaffold, tower crane.
 To access atmospheric conditions aloft: wind turbine, meteorological measurement tower, tower telescope, solar power station
 To lift high tension cables for electrical power distribution transmission tower
 To take advantage of the temperature gradient inherent in a height differential: cooling tower
 To expel and disperse potentially harmful gases and particulates into the atmosphere: chimney
 To protect from exposure: BREN Tower, lightning rod tower
 For industrial production: shot tower
 For surveying: Survey tower
 To drop objects: Drop tube (drop tower), bomb tower, diving platform
 To test height-intensive applications: elevator test tower
 To improve structural integrity: thyristor tower
 To mimic towers or provide height for training purposes: fire tower, parachute tower
 As art: Shukhov Tower
 For recreation: rock climbing tower
 As a symbol: Tower of Babel, The Tower (Tarot card), church tower

The term "tower" is also sometimes used to refer to firefighting equipment with an extremely tall ladder designed for use in firefighting/rescue operations involving high-rise buildings.

Gallery

See also

General
 Additionally guyed tower
 Bell tower
 Inclined towers
 Observation tower
 Partially guyed tower
 Smog tower
 World's tallest structures
 Spire
 Tower house
 List of tallest towers in the world

Warfare
 Battery tower
 Bergfried
 Breaching tower
 Butter-churn tower
 Flanking tower
 Fortified tower
 Gate tower
 Turret
 Watchtower
 Wall tower

References

Further reading
 Fritz Leonhardt (1989), Towers: a historical survey, Butterworth Architecture, 343 pages.

External links